Shining Vale is an American comedy horror television series created by Jeff Astrof and Sharon Horgan. The series stars Courteney Cox, Greg Kinnear, Sherilyn Fenn, Mira Sorvino, Merrin Dungey, and Judith Light. It premiered on Starz on March 6, 2022. In May 2022, the series was renewed for a second season.

Premise
A dysfunctional family moves from the city to a small town after Patricia "Pat" Phelps, a former "wild child" who became famous through writing raunchy female empowerment novels, is caught cheating on her husband. The house the family moves into is a place where in the past, terrible atrocities have taken place. Nobody seems to suspect anything odd except for Pat who's convinced she's either depressed or possessed. Pat has been sober for 16 years, but begins to feel very unfulfilled in life – she still hasn't written her second novel, she can't remember the last time she had sex with her husband and her teenage kids have grown up to the point they don't want their mother in their lives. Soon, the demons haunting the family's new home begin to appear much more real.

Cast and characters

Main
 Courteney Cox as Patricia "Pat" Phelps
 Greg Kinnear as Terry Phelps
 Gus Birney as Gaynor Phelps
 Dylan Gage as Jake Phelps
 Merrin Dungey as Kam
 Mira Sorvino as Rosemary Wellingham

Recurring
 Sherilyn Fenn as Robyn Court
 Judith Light as Joan
 Alysia Reiner as Kathryn
 Susan Park as Valerie He
 Derek Luh as Ryan He
 Parvesh Cheena as Laird
 James M. Connor as Dr. Berg
 Ellie Grace Pomeroy as Daisy Wellingham

Episodes

Production

Development
In January 2018, it was announced that Showtime had put the project from Warner Bros. Television Studios in development with a pilot production commitment. Jeff Astrof and Sharon Horgan were set to write and create the series, as well as executive produce alongside Clelia Mountford for Horgan's production company Merman and Aaron Kaplan and Dana Honor of Kapital Entertainment. In August 2019, the project was given an official pilot order, with the series moving to Starz and Lionsgate Television joining as a co-production studio. In February 2020, Dearbhla Walsh was set to direct and executive produce the pilot. In April 2021, Starz gave the project a series order consisting of 8 half-hour episodes. In May 2022, Starz renewed the series for an eight-episode second season.

Casting
In February 2020, Courteney Cox was cast in the lead role. In July 2020, Greg Kinnear joined the main cast alongside Gus Birney and Dylan Gage who were added the following month. In February 2021, Mira Sorvino and Merrin Dungey were cast in main roles. In July 2021, Alysia Reiner was cast in a recurring role. The following month, Judith Light joined the main cast.

Filming
The pilot episode was filmed throughout March 2021 in Los Angeles. Other episodes in the season were filmed in July 2021.

Reception

Critical response
On review aggregator website Rotten Tomatoes, the series holds a 71% approval rating based on 24 critic reviews, with an average rating of 6.20/10. The website's critics consensus reads, "Shining Vales uneasy mix of comedy and horror can be transparently try-hard, but Courteney Cox's saucy performance gives this genre mashup a glitter of promise." On Metacritic, the series has a score of 61 out of 100, based on 16 critic reviews, indicating "generally favorable reviews".

Ratings

Awards and nominations

References

External links
 

2020s American horror comedy television series
2022 American television series debuts
Adultery in television
English-language television shows
Starz original programming
Television about mental health
Television series about demons
Television series about dysfunctional families
Television series about religion
Television series by Lionsgate Television
Television series by Kapital Entertainment
Television series by Warner Bros. Television Studios
Television shows filmed in Los Angeles